Tracy W. Krohn (born August 26, 1954, in Houston, Texas) is an entrepreneur and auto racing enthusiast who was a new addition to the 2006 Forbes 400 list of the wealthiest Americans, at #320.

Biography
He has a petroleum engineering degree from Louisiana State University and has worked as an engineer and drilling supervisor for Mobil Oil. Krohn founded W&T Offshore with $12,000 in 1983. He resides in Houston.

His racing team, Krohn Racing currently competes in the European Le Mans Series. In March 2007 he and Lola Racing Cars created Proto-Auto LLC and purchased a chassis design and Grand American Daytona Prototype Constructors Licence from Multimatic Motorsports, a racing car constructor, to build a Lola chassis for Grand-Am Daytona Prototype competition in 2008 and beyond.

Krohn entered the Intercontinental Le Mans Cup in 2011, finishing second in the GTE-Am class standings. Since 2012, the team competes in the FIA World Endurance Championship. They started off with a Ferrari F458 Italia in GTE-Am, but since 2015 they compete in the LMP2 class with a Ligier JS P2 powered by Judd.

24 Hours of Le Mans results

Complete European Le Mans Series results
(key) (Races in bold indicate pole position; races in italics indicate fastest lap)

Complete FIA World Endurance Championship results
(key) (Races in bold indicate pole position; races in italics indicate fastest lap)

Complete WeatherTech SportsCar Championship results
(key) (Races in bold indicate pole position; results in italics indicate fastest lap)

See also
 Krohn Racing

External links

Forbes – The 400 Richest Americans
Tracy W. Krohn
W&T Offshore
Krohn Racing

American energy industry businesspeople
Louisiana State University alumni
Rolex Sports Car Series drivers
1954 births
Living people
24 Hours of Le Mans drivers
24 Hours of Daytona drivers
American Le Mans Series drivers
European Le Mans Series drivers
Racing drivers from Houston
FIA World Endurance Championship drivers
WeatherTech SportsCar Championship drivers
21st-century American businesspeople
24H Series drivers

20th-century American businesspeople
Eurasia Motorsport drivers
AF Corse drivers
Nürburgring 24 Hours drivers
Sports car racing team owners